Northern Australia Roads Program is a suite of projects designed to deliver upgrades to high priority roads in northern Australia. In 2016 the Australian Government announced 19 projects to be funded under this program, and in 2020 another was added. This program is separate to the Northern Australia Beef Roads Program, also announced in 2016, which contains a further 18 projects.

Funding and program status
Funding by the Australian Government is up to 80% of total costs, with the remainder being met by state, territory and local governments. The initial funding allocation by the Australian Government was $600 million, most of which has now (in March 2022) been expended on the identified projects, most of which have been completed or are nearing completion.

In the 2022 Federal Budget a further $380 million over four years was allocated for projects yet to be determined.

Type of work
The work undertaken includes bridge and culvert construction, road widening, sealing, overtaking lanes and pavement renewal.

Projects
The roads involved in the 20 projects are listed below.

Queensland
 Flinders Highway (2 projects)
 Capricorn Highway
 Kennedy Developmental Road (2 projects)
 Barkly Highway
 Bowen Developmental Road
 Landsborough Highway
 Peak Downs Highway
 Bajool-Port Alma Road,

Northern Territory
 Plenty Highway
 Tjukaruru Road
 Keep River Plains Road
 Arnhem Highway
 Buntine Highway

Western Australia
 Great Northern Highway (3 projects)
 Marble Bar Road
 Broome-Cape Leveque Road

Project details
Where there is an article about a road the project details have been included therein. For roads with no article the details are shown below.

Bajool-Port Alma Road
The project for pavement widening and safety upgrades to the port access road was completed by January 2022 at a total cost of $14.5 million.

Keep River Plains Road
The project to upgrade and seal sections of the road and construct two new bridges over Keep River and Sandy Creek was completed in late 2020 at a total cost of $87.3 million.

White Paper on Developing Northern Australia
The Northern Australia Roads Program is part of the White Paper on Developing Northern Australia, a $600 million commitment to upgrade high priority roads in northern Australia.

Parliamentary report
The Parliament of Australia has produced a report on transport infrastructure that includes extensive details of the Northern Australia Roads Program, among others.

Press recognition
The Roads and Infrastructure magazine has published details of the progress of a number of projects under the Northern Australia Roads Program.

Progress reporting
As Queensland projects under the Northern Australia Roads Program reach significant milestones these are reported on the Department of Transport and Main Roads website.

Completed Queensland projects

See also
 Northern Australia
 Road transport in Australia

References

External links 
 Our North, Our Future: White Paper on Developing Northern Australia

Northern Australia
Roads in Australia
Lists of roads in Australia